Gadai may refer to:

 Gadai (clan), a sub-clan of the Bugti tribe.
 Gadai, Punjab, a town in the Punjab Province of Pakistan.